Barnim is a Pomeranian Slavic origin given name derived from names: Barnimir, Barnisław (which contain word "barni, broni" - to protect) and may refer to:  

Several Pomeranian rulers:

Barnim I the Good (1217–1278), duke of Pomerania

Barnim III the Great (1300–1368), duke of Pomerania-Stettin

Barnim IX (1501–1573), also known as Barnim XI the Old, duke of Pomerania-Stettin

Following places:
Barnim, a district in Brandenburg, Germany
Barnim, West Pomeranian Voivodeship, a village in north-western Poland

See also

 Barnim Plateau
 Slavic names

Polish masculine given names
Slavic masculine given names
Masculine given names